Melikşah Üniversitesi Gençlik ve Spor Kulübü, commonly known as Melikşah Üniversitesi, was a Turkish professional basketball club based in Kayseri. During its three-year existence, the club played in the TBL, the second tier of Turkish basketball. The team was founded by Kayseri Melikşah Üniversitesi in 2013. Their home arena was Recep Mamur Sports Hall, which has a capacity of 500 seats. The team was sponsored by Mondi, which is a furniture company, and therefore was named Mondi Melikşah Üniversitesi during its last two seasons.

Season by season

External links 
 Eurobasket.com page

Basketball teams in Turkey
Basketball teams established in 2013
Sport in Kayseri